Omar El-Hadary (1924 – 4 September 2003) was an Egyptian equestrian. He competed in two events at the 1956 Summer Olympics.

References

External links
 

1924 births
2003 deaths
Egyptian male equestrians
Olympic equestrians of Egypt
Equestrians at the 1956 Summer Olympics
Place of birth missing